Information technology service management (ITSM) is the activities that are performed by an organization to design, build, deliver, operate and control information technology (IT) services offered to customers.

Differing from more technology-oriented IT management approaches like network management and  IT systems management, IT service management is characterized by adopting a process approach towards management, focusing on customer needs and IT services for customers rather than IT systems, and stressing continual improvement. The CIO WaterCooler's annual ITSM report states that business uses ITSM "mostly in support of customer experience (35%) and service quality (48%)."

Context

As a discipline, ITSM has ties and common interests with other IT and general management approaches,  information security management and software engineering. Consequently, IT service management frameworks have been influenced by other standards and adopted concepts from them, e.g. CMMI, ISO 9000, or ISO/IEC 27000.

Professional organizations
There are international, chapter-based professional associations, such as the IT Service Management Forum (itSMF), and HDI. The main goal of these organizations is to foster the exchange of experiences and ideas between users of ITSM frameworks. To this end, national and local itSMF and HDI chapters (LIGs or local interest groups for itSMF)  organize conferences and workshops. Some of them also contribute to the translations of ITSM framework documents into their respective languages or publish their own ITSM guides. There are several certifications for service management like ITILv4, TOGAF or COBIT.

Various frameworks

Various frameworks for ITSM and overlapping disciplines include:
 ITIL(Information Technology Infrastructure Library) is a set of detailed practices for IT activities such as IT service management (ITSM) and IT asset management (ITAM) that focus on aligning IT services with the needs of business. 
 TOGAF is a framework and methodology that aims to define business goals while aligning them with architecture objectives related to software development.
 Business Process Framework (eTOM) is a process framework for telecommunications service providers.
 COBIT (Control Objectives for Information and Related Technologies) is an IT Governance framework that specifies control objectives, metrics and maturity models. Recent versions have aligned the naming of select control objectives to established ITSM process names.
 FitSM is a standard for lightweight service management. It contains several parts, including e.g. auditable requirements and document templates, which are published under Creative Common licenses. Its basic process framework is in large parts aligned to that of ISO/IEC 20000.
 CMMI, guides all types of service providers to establish, manage, and improve services to meet business goals.
 ASL's goal is the professional development of application management. This is achieved by offering a framework within which the processes of application management are brought in relation to each other.
 USM, the principle-based USM method provides a standardized management system for a service organization to manage its people, its processes, its technology, and its services, based on an explicit service management architecture.
 ISO/IEC 20000 is an international standard for managing and delivering IT services. Its process model bears many similarities to that of ITIL version 2, since BS 15000 (precursor of ISO/IEC 20000) and ITIL were mutually aligned up to version 2 of ITIL. ISO/IEC 20000 defines minimum requirements for an effective "service management system" (SMS). Conformance of the SMS to ISO/IEC can be audited and organizations can achieve an ISO/IEC 20000 certification of their SMS for a defined scope.
 BiSL is a framework of best practices for the Information Management domain.
 MOF (Microsoft Operations Framework) includes, in addition to a general framework of service management functions, guidance on managing services based on Microsoft technologies.

Process 

Execution of ITSM processes in an organization, especially those processes that are more workflow-driven, can benefit significantly from being supported with specialized software tools.

ITSM tools are often marketed as ITSM suites, which support a whole set of ITSM processes. At their core is usually a workflow management system for handling incidents, service requests, problems and changes. They usually also include a tool for a configuration management database. The ability of these suites to enable easy linking between incident, service request, problem and change records with each other and with records of configuration items from the CMDB, can be a great advantage.
ITSM tools and processes are commonly referred to as ITIL tools, when in fact they are not the same. More than 100 tools are self-proclaimed ITSM. Software vendors whose ITSM tools fulfill defined functional requirements to support a set of ITIL processes, can obtain official approval, allowing them to use Axelos trademarks and an "ITIL process compliant" logo, under Axelos' ITIL Software Endorsement scheme.

A Service Desk is a primary IT function within the discipline of IT service management (ITSM) as defined by ITIL. It is intended to provide a Single Point of Contact ("SPOC") to meet the communication needs of both users and IT staff, and also to satisfy both Customer and IT Provider objectives. "User" refers to the actual user of the service, while "Customer" refers to the entity that is paying for the service.  ITSM tools are frequently applied to other aspects of business, this practice is often called enterprise service management (ESM).  One of the big pushes in ITSM is automation of mundane tasks, this allows people who perform these task to take on more critical tasks, this process called IT process automation.

The ITIL approach considers the service desk to be the central point of contact between service providers and users/customers on a day-to-day basis. It is also a focal point for reporting incidents (disruptions or potential disruptions in service availability or quality) and for users making service requests (routine requests for services).

ITIL regards a call centre or help desk as similar kinds of service desk which provide only a portion of what a service desk can offer. A service desk has a more broad and user-centered approach which is designed to provide the user with an informed single point of contact for all IT requirements. A service desk seeks to facilitate the integration of business processes into the service management infrastructure. In addition to actively monitoring and owning Incidents and user questions, and providing the communications channel for other service management disciplines with the user community, a service desk also provides an interface for other activities such as customer change requests, third parties (e.g. maintenance contracts), and software licensing.

See also
 Call centre 
 Customer service 
 Network and service management taxonomy

References

External links

 
Telephony
Customer service
Services marketing